Arthur Grant (born 10 June 1957 in Bellshill) is a Scottish former football winger.

Grant began his career with Clyde, and made over 100 appearances with the club, before moving to Alloa Athletic. He reached 100 appearances for the "Wasps" as well, and had spells with Falkirk, Hamilton Academical, Stenhousemuir, Dumbarton and East Stirlingshire, before finishing his career with Alloa.

References

External links

Living people
1957 births
Scottish footballers
Sportspeople from Rutherglen
Clyde F.C. players
Alloa Athletic F.C. players
Falkirk F.C. players
Hamilton Academical F.C. players
Stenhousemuir F.C. players
Dumbarton F.C. players
East Stirlingshire F.C. players
Association football wingers
Footballers from South Lanarkshire